F. B. Norris was the fourth Surveyor General of Ceylon. He was appointed in 1833, succeeding Gualterus Schneider, and held the office until 1846. He was succeeded by H. Chims.

References

N